Mad Flavor is an album by the singer/songwriter Lida Husik. It was released in 1999 through Alias Records.

Critical reception
The Boston Phoenix wrote that "in the absence of strong songs Mad Flavor is merely a beautiful listen that doesn't leave much of a lasting taste." San Francisco Examiner wrote that while Husik's "voice is as lazily melodic as ever, her reliance on electronica-flavored bells and whistles here is more annoying than groundbreaking."

Track listing

Personnel
Musicians
Jerry Busher – drums and percussion on "Jupiterstar" and "State of the Empire"
Brandon Finley – drums on "Cactus Garden Days" and "Trash Out Tonight"
Lida Husik – vocals, instruments
Hilary Soldati – cello on "Jupiterstar"
Seb Thompson – drums on "Dynamite"
Gregory "El Flaco" Woods – percussion on "Dynamite", "Trash Out Tonight", "Glo Stick" and "We Saw"
Production and additional personnel
Charles Bennington – production, programming, drum machine, saxophone on "State of the Empire"
Geoff Turner – production, keyboards on "Trash Out Tonight" and "State of the Empire"

References

External links 
 

1999 albums
Lida Husik albums